United States gubernatorial elections were held on November 3, 2009, in the states of New Jersey and Virginia, as well as in the U.S. commonwealth of the Northern Mariana Islands on November 7, 2009. Both state governorships were previously held by Democrats elected in 2005, and both were won by Republicans in 2009; the local Covenant Party maintained control of the governorship of the Marianas. These elections formed part of the 2009 United States elections.

Due to the passage of Senate Legislative Initiative 16-11, this was the last year in the Commonwealth of the Northern Mariana Islands in which a gubernatorial election occurred on a pre-midterm, off-year election year, as the next gubernatorial election would be in 2014.

The Democrats held 28 governorships, while the Republicans held 22. In this election, both U.S. governorships up for election were held by Democrats, while the governorship of the Northern Mariana Islands was held by the Covenant Party.

Race summary

|-
! style="background:#e9e9e9;" colspan="2" rowspan="2"| Party
!  style="background:#e9e9e9; text-align:center;" colspan="2"| Popular vote
! style="background:#e9e9e9;" colspan="2" rowspan="2"| Seats won
|-
!  style="background:#e9e9e9; text-align:right;"| Vote
!  style="background:#e9e9e9; text-align:right;"| %
|-
| 
| style="text-align: left" | Republican Party
| align=right | 2,349,108 
| 52.97%
| 2
|-
| 
| style="text-align: left" | Democratic Party
| align=right | 1,906,640 
| 42.99%
| 0
|-
| 
| style="text-align: left" | Covenant Party
| align=right | 11,502 
| 0.03%
| 1
|-
| 
| style="text-align: left" | Others
| align=right | 167,705 
| 3.78%
| 0
|-
! colspan="2" style="text-align:left;"| Total
| align=right | 4,434,955 
| 100%
| 3
|}

States

Territory

Closest races 
States where the margin of victory was under 5%:
 Northern Mariana Islands, 2.8%
 New Jersey, 4.3%

Red denotes states won by Republicans. Green denotes states won by Covenants.

New Jersey 

Democratic Governor Jon Corzine was eligible to run for a second term and did so. He was considered vulnerable given a number of recent scandals and low approval ratings.
Former Glen Ridge Mayor Carl Bergmanson, failed 2008 congressional candidate Roger Bacon, and failed 2008 Senate candidate Jeff Boss also sought the Democratic nomination. Corzine won the Democratic primary on June 2.

U.S. Attorney Chris Christie was the Republican gubernatorial nominee.  Christie defeated former Bogota Mayor Steve Lonegan and veteran General Assemblyman Rick Merkt in the Republican primary on June 2.

Chris Daggett, who was Commissioner of the New Jersey Department of Environmental Protection under Governor Thomas Kean, Sr. and regional administrator of the Environmental Protection Agency under President Ronald W. Reagan, ran as an independent. Daggett raised enough money to file for public funds and appear in both debates.

On November 3, 2009, Republican Christie unseated Democratic incumbent Governor Corzine. His margin of victory was 49% to 45%. Daggett's role as a "spoiler candidate" (some polls had him taking 10 percent of the vote) never materialized.

Virginia 

Virginia's term limits law allows governors to run for more than one term; however, the terms cannot be consecutive. Thus, incumbent Governor Tim Kaine could not stand for re-election.

Candidates for the Democratic nomination included Terry McAuliffe, former Chairman of the Democratic National Committee and Hillary Clinton's former campaign manager; State Senator Creigh Deeds; and State Delegate Brian Moran. Deeds won the Democratic primary on June 9, 2009 with approximately 49% of the vote, beating out Terry McAliffe with 26% and Brian Moran with 23%.

The Republican nominee was Virginia Attorney General Bob McDonnell. This was the sixth consecutive Virginian gubernatorial election where an elected Attorney General has run.

On November 3, 2009, Bob McDonnell defeated Creigh Deeds to become Governor-elect of Virginia. His margin of victory was a landslide 59% to 41%.

Territory

Northern Mariana Islands 

Governor Benigno R. Fitial, a member of the local Covenant Party, was eligible to run for a second term and did so. Rep. Heinz Hofschneider won the Republican nomination in June, defeating former Republican Governor Juan N. Babauta, who was defeated in his 2005 re-election by Fitial. Ramon "Kumoi" Guerrero and Juan "Pan" Guerrero, two former members of the Northern Mariana Islands Senate, both ran as independents.

The CNMI election was held on Saturday, November 7, 2009. No candidate received a majority, so Governor Fital and Rep. Hofschneider advanced to a runoff election on November 23. Fital won with a 370-vote margin.

Notes

References